The 1990–91 NBA season was the Spurs' 15th season in the National Basketball Association, and 24th season as a franchise. During the off-season, the Spurs acquired Paul Pressey from the Milwaukee Bucks. After a promising rookie season from second-year star David Robinson, the Spurs would win 17 of their first 22 games, holding a 32–13 record at the All-Star break. However, with Terry Cummings and Rod Strickland lost for long stretched games due to hand injuries, the team struggled in February with a 4–7 record. At midseason, the team released Reggie Williams to free agency, and signed free agent Avery Johnson, who was previously released by the Denver Nuggets. The Spurs would bounce back winning 13 of their final 17 games as they won the Midwest Division with a solid 55–27 record.

Robinson averaged 25.6 points, 13.0 rebounds, and 3.9 blocks per game while being selected to the All-NBA First Team, All-Defensive Second Team, and for selected the 1991 NBA All-Star Game. In addition, Cummings averaged 17.6 points and 7.8 rebounds per game, while second-year forward Sean Elliott provided the team with 15.9 points and 5.6 rebounds per game, Willie Anderson contributed 14.4 points and 4.8 assists per game, and Strickland provided with 13.8 points, 8.0 assists and 2.0 steals per game. Robinson also finished in third place in Most Valuable Player voting, and in second place in Defensive Player of the Year voting, and head coach Larry Brown finished tied in fifth place in Coach of the Year voting.

In the Western Conference First Round of the playoffs, the Spurs faced the 7th-seeded Golden State Warriors, led by the trio of Chris Mullin, Mitch Richmond and Tim Hardaway. The Spurs won Game 1 at home, 130–121, but would then lose the next three games, thus the series. Following the season, David Wingate signed as a free agent with the Washington Bullets.

On November 3, 1990, the Spurs hosted the Los Angeles Lakers on the premiere broadcast of the NBA on NBC.

Draft picks

Roster

Regular season

Season standings

y - clinched division title
x - clinched playoff spot

z - clinched division title
y - clinched division title
x - clinched playoff spot

Record vs. opponents

Game log

Regular season

|- align="center" bgcolor="#ccffcc"
| 1
| November 3
| L.A. Lakers
| W 110–99
|
|
|
| HemisFair Arena
| 1–0
|- align="center" bgcolor="#ccffcc"
| 2
| November 7
| Denver
| W 161–153
|
|
|
| HemisFair Arena
| 2–0
|- align="center" bgcolor="#ffcccc"
| 3
| November 8
| @ Utah
| L 94–103
|
|
|
| Salt Palace
| 2–1
|- align="center" bgcolor="#ccffcc"
| 4
| November 10
| Houston
| W 111–110
|
|
|
| HemisFair Arena
| 3–1
|- align="center" bgcolor="#ffcccc"
| 5
| November 13
| @ Golden State
| L 124–128
|
|
|
| Oakland–Alameda County Coliseum Arena
| 3–2
|- align="center" bgcolor="#ccffcc"
| 6
| November 15
| @ Sacramento
| W 122–93
|
|
|
| ARCO Arena
| 4–2
|- align="center" bgcolor="#ccffcc"
| 7
| November 17
| Phoenix
| W 128–114
|
|
|
| HemisFair Arena
| 5–2
|- align="center" bgcolor="#ccffcc"
| 8
| November 21
| Minnesota
| W 114–100
|
|
|
| HemisFair Arena
| 6–2
|- align="center" bgcolor="#ccffcc"
| 9
| November 23
| @ Dallas
| W 107–104
|
|
|
| Reunion Arena
| 7–2
|- align="center" bgcolor="#ffcccc"
| 10
| November 25
| @ Portland
| L 103–117
|
|
|
| Memorial Coliseum
| 7–3
|- align="center" bgcolor="#ccffcc"
| 11
| November 27
| @ Seattle
| W 124–111
|
|
|
| Seattle Center Coliseum
| 8–3
|- align="center" bgcolor="#ffcccc"
| 12
| November 28
| @ L.A. Lakers
| L 80–97
|
|
|
| Great Western Forum
| 8–4

|- align="center" bgcolor="#ccffcc"
| 13
| December 1
| Dallas
| W 109–97
|
|
|
| HemisFair Arena
| 9–4
|- align="center" bgcolor="#ffcccc"
| 14
| December 5
| Atlanta
| L 108–110
|
|
|
| HemisFair Arena
| 9–5
|- align="center" bgcolor="#ccffcc"
| 15
| December 8
| Boston
| W 102–96
|
|
|
| HemisFair Arena
| 10–5
|- align="center" bgcolor="#ccffcc"
| 16
| December 11
| @ Detroit
| W 95–86
|
|
|
| Palace of Auburn Hills
| 11–5
|- align="center" bgcolor="#ccffcc"
| 17
| December 12
| @ Charlotte
| W 92–81
|
|
|
| Charlotte Coliseum
| 12–5
|- align="center" bgcolor="#ccffcc"
| 18
| December 14
| @ Cleveland
| W 116–106 (OT)
|
|
|
| Richfield Coliseum
| 13–5
|- align="center" bgcolor="#ccffcc"
| 19
| December 15
| @ Minnesota
| W 90–74
|
|
|
| Target Center
| 14–5
|- align="center" bgcolor="#ccffcc"
| 20
| December 18
| @ Houston
| W 96–95
|
|
|
| The Summit
| 15–5
|- align="center" bgcolor="#ccffcc"
| 21
| December 19
| Denver
| W 144–109
|
|
|
| HemisFair Arena
| 16–5
|- align="center" bgcolor="#ccffcc"
| 22
| December 21
| @ Phoenix
| W 132–128 (OT)
|
|
|
| Arizona Veterans Memorial Coliseum
| 17–5
|- align="center" bgcolor="#ffcccc"
| 23
| December 22
| Milwaukee
| L 98–114
|
|
|
| HemisFair Arena
| 17–6
|- align="center" bgcolor="#ccffcc"
| 24
| December 26
| Miami
| W 111–97
|
|
|
| HemisFair Arena
| 18–6
|- align="center" bgcolor="#ccffcc"
| 25
| December 28
| Sacramento
| W 104–88
|
|
|
| HemisFair Arena
| 19–6

|- align="center" bgcolor="#ffcccc"
| 26
| January 2
| @ Indiana
| L 109–121
|
|
|
| Market Square Arena
| 19–7
|- align="center" bgcolor="#ccffcc"
| 27
| January 4
| @ New Jersey
| W 93–89
|
|
|
| Brendan Byrne Arena
| 20–7
|- align="center" bgcolor="#ccffcc"
| 28
| January 5
| @ Orlando
| W 107–90
|
|
|
| Orlando Arena
| 21–7
|- align="center" bgcolor="#ccffcc"
| 29
| January 7
| @ Philadelphia
| W 111–102 (OT)
|
|
|
| The Spectrum
| 22–7
|- align="center" bgcolor="#ffcccc"
| 30
| January 8
| @ Atlanta
| L 98–109
|
|
|
| The Omni
| 22–8
|- align="center" bgcolor="#ccffcc"
| 31
| January 10
| Orlando
| W 117–111
|
|
|
| HemisFair Arena
| 23–8
|- align="center" bgcolor="#ccffcc"
| 32
| January 12
| Utah
| W 112–92
|
|
|
| HemisFair Arena
| 24–8
|- align="center" bgcolor="#ffcccc"
| 33
| January 15
| @ Utah
| L 102–124
|
|
|
| Salt Palace
| 24–9
|- align="center" bgcolor="#ccffcc"
| 34
| January 16
| Dallas
| W 100–94
|
|
|
| HemisFair Arena
| 25–9
|- align="center" bgcolor="#ffcccc"
| 35
| January 18
| Charlotte
| L 110–117
|
|
|
| HemisFair Arena
| 25–10
|- align="center" bgcolor="#ccffcc"
| 36
| January 19
| @ Denver
| W 117–108
|
|
|
| McNichols Sports Arena
| 26–10
|- align="center" bgcolor="#ccffcc"
| 37
| January 22
| L.A. Clippers
| W 106–100
|
|
|
| HemisFair Arena
| 27–10
|- align="center" bgcolor="#ccffcc"
| 38
| January 24
| Cleveland
| W 111–103
|
|
|
| HemisFair Arena
| 28–10
|- align="center" bgcolor="#ccffcc"
| 39
| January 26
| Minnesota
| W 112–105
|
|
|
| HemisFair Arena
| 29–10
|- align="center" bgcolor="#ccffcc"
| 40
| January 28
| Seattle
| W 119–107
|
|
|
| HemisFair Arena
| 30–10
|- align="center" bgcolor="#ffcccc"
| 41
| January 29
| @ Houston
| L 89–91
|
|
|
| The Summit
| 30–11
|- align="center" bgcolor="#ccffcc"
| 42
| January 31
| Chicago
| W 106–102
|
|
|
| HemisFair Arena
| 31–11

|- align="center" bgcolor="#ffcccc"
| 43
| February 2
| Houston
| L 94–100 (OT)
|
|
|
| HemisFair Arena
| 31–12
|- align="center" bgcolor="#ffcccc"
| 44
| February 5
| Golden State
| L 106–112
|
|
|
| HemisFair Arena
| 31–13
|- align="center" bgcolor="#ccffcc"
| 45
| February 7
| Indiana
| W 118–108
|
|
|
| HemisFair Arena
| 32–13
|- align="center" bgcolor="#ccffcc"
| 46
| February 12
| Washington
| W 102–92
|
|
|
| HemisFair Arena
| 33–13
|- align="center" bgcolor="#ffcccc"
| 47
| February 14
| Phoenix
| L 97–106
|
|
|
| HemisFair Arena
| 33–14
|- align="center" bgcolor="#ffcccc"
| 48
| February 16
| @ Dallas
| L 94–96
|
|
|
| Reunion Arena
| 33–15
|- align="center" bgcolor="#ffcccc"
| 49
| February 18
| @ Utah
| L 81–104
|
|
|
| Salt Palace
| 33–16
|- align="center" bgcolor="#ffcccc"
| 50
| February 22
| @ L.A. Clippers
| L 101–107
|
|
|
| Los Angeles Memorial Sports Arena
| 33–17
|- align="center" bgcolor="#ccffcc"
| 51
| February 24
| @ Portland
| W 95–88
|
|
|
| Memorial Coliseum
| 34–17
|- align="center" bgcolor="#ccffcc"
| 52
| February 26
| Portland
| W 102–101 (OT)
|
|
|
| HemisFair Arena
| 35–17
|- align="center" bgcolor="#ffcccc"
| 53
| February 28
| @ New York
| L 93–100
|
|
|
| Madison Square Garden
| 35–18

|- align="center" bgcolor="#ffcccc"
| 54
| March 1
| @ Boston
| L 98–108
|
|
|
| Boston Garden
| 35–19
|- align="center" bgcolor="#ccffcc"
| 55
| March 3
| @ Washington
| W 107–85
|
|
|
| Capital Centre
| 36–19
|- align="center" bgcolor="#ccffcc"
| 56
| March 5
| Philadelphia
| W 104–99
|
|
|
| HemisFair Arena
| 37–19
|- align="center" bgcolor="#ccffcc"
| 57
| March 7
| New Jersey
| W 111–99
|
|
|
| HemisFair Arena
| 38–19
|- align="center" bgcolor="#ccffcc"
| 58
| March 9
| Seattle
| W 112–99
|
|
|
| HemisFair Arena
| 39–19
|- align="center" bgcolor="#ccffcc"
| 59
| March 11
| Utah
| W 105–96
|
|
|
| HemisFair Arena
| 40–19
|- align="center" bgcolor="#ffcccc"
| 60
| March 13
| @ L.A. Clippers
| L 93–97
|
|
|
| Los Angeles Memorial Sports Arena
| 40–20
|- align="center" bgcolor="#ccffcc"
| 61
| March 14
| @ Golden State
| W 101–99
|
|
|
| Oakland–Alameda County Coliseum Arena
| 41–20
|- align="center" bgcolor="#ffcccc"
| 62
| March 16
| @ Sacramento
| L 85–92
|
|
|
| ARCO Arena
| 41–21
|- align="center" bgcolor="#ffcccc"
| 63
| March 17
| @ L.A. Lakers
| L 91–98
|
|
|
| Great Western Forum
| 41–22
|- align="center" bgcolor="#ccffcc"
| 64
| March 19
| Sacramento
| W 104–101
|
|
|
| HemisFair Arena
| 42–22
|- align="center" bgcolor="#ffcccc"
| 65
| March 21
| @ Orlando
| L 102–105
|
|
|
| Orlando Arena
| 42–23
|- align="center" bgcolor="#ccffcc"
| 66
| March 22
| @ Miami
| W 97–90
|
|
|
| Miami Arena
| 43–23
|- align="center" bgcolor="#ccffcc"
| 67
| March 24
| Detroit
| W 85–78
|
|
|
| HemisFair Arena
| 44–23
|- align="center" bgcolor="#ccffcc"
| 68
| March 26
| New York
| W 129–119 (OT)
|
|
|
| HemisFair Arena
| 45–23
|- align="center" bgcolor="#ccffcc"
| 69
| March 28
| Orlando
| W 119–95
|
|
|
| HemisFair Arena
| 46–23
|- align="center" bgcolor="#ccffcc"
| 70
| March 30
| Denver
| W 130–116
|
|
|
| HemisFair Arena
| 47–23

|- align="center" bgcolor="#ffcccc"
| 71
| April 2
| L.A. Lakers
| L 115–122
|
|
|
| HemisFair Arena
| 47–24
|- align="center" bgcolor="#ccffcc"
| 72
| April 4
| @ Milwaukee
| W 105–101
|
|
|
| Bradley Center
| 48–24
|- align="center" bgcolor="#ccffcc"
| 73
| April 5
| @ Chicago
| W 110–107
|
|
|
| Chicago Stadium
| 49–24
|- align="center" bgcolor="#ccffcc"
| 74
| April 7
| @ Minnesota
| W 92–87
|
|
|
| Target Center
| 50–24
|- align="center" bgcolor="#ccffcc"
| 75
| April 8
| Golden State
| W 115–105
|
|
|
| HemisFair Arena
| 51–24
|- align="center" bgcolor="#ffcccc"
| 76
| April 10
| Portland
| L 100–105
|
|
|
| HemisFair Arena
| 51–25
|- align="center" bgcolor="#ffcccc"
| 77
| April 12
| @ Seattle
| L 99–100
|
|
|
| Seattle Center Coliseum
| 51–26
|- align="center" bgcolor="#ccffcc"
| 78
| April 14
| @ Phoenix
| W 109–101
|
|
|
| Arizona Veterans Memorial Coliseum
| 52–26
|- align="center" bgcolor="#ccffcc"
| 79
| April 16
| L.A. Clippers
| W 128–98
|
|
|
| HemisFair Arena
| 53–26
|- align="center" bgcolor="#ccffcc"
| 80
| April 18
| @ Houston
| W 102–95
|
|
|
| The Summit
| 54–26
|- align="center" bgcolor="#ffcccc"
| 81
| April 19
| @ Denver
| L 122–125
|
|
|
| McNichols Sports Arena
| 54–27
|- align="center" bgcolor="#ccffcc"
| 82
| April 21
| Dallas
| W 135–101
|
|
|
| HemisFair Arena
| 55–27

Playoffs

|- align="center" bgcolor="#ccffcc"
| 1
| April 25
| Golden State
| W 130–121
| Willie Anderson (38)
| David Robinson (13)
| Rod Strickland (13)
| HemisFair Arena15,908
| 1–0
|- align="center" bgcolor="#ffcccc"
| 2
| April 27
| Golden State
| L 98–111
| David Robinson (28)
| David Robinson (15)
| Rod Strickland (7)
| HemisFair Arena15,908
| 1–1
|- align="center" bgcolor="#ffcccc"
| 3
| May 1
| @ Golden State
| L 106–109
| David Robinson (27)
| David Robinson (12)
| Rod Strickland (7)
| Oakland–Alameda County Coliseum Arena15,025
| 1–2
|- align="center" bgcolor="#ffcccc"
| 4
| May 3
| @ Golden State
| L 97–110
| Sean Elliott (23)
| David Robinson (14)
| Rod Strickland (8)
| Oakland–Alameda County Coliseum Arena15,025
| 1–3
|-

Player statistics

Season

Playoffs

Awards and records
David Robinson, NBA All-Star
David Robinson, All-NBA First Team
David Robinson, NBA All-Defensive First Team

Transactions

References

See also
1990-91 NBA season

San Antonio Spurs seasons
San Antonio
San Antonio
San Antonio